Alfonso Javier Urbina Milla  (born 18 May 1993) is a Chilean footballer who plays as a midfielder.

References

External links
  (archive)
 

1993 births
Living people
Sportspeople from Viña del Mar
Chilean footballers
Chilean expatriate footballers
Everton de Viña del Mar footballers
A.C. Barnechea footballers
Venados F.C. players
Deportes Vallenar footballers
Primera B de Chile players
Chilean Primera División players
Segunda División Profesional de Chile players
Ascenso MX players
Chilean expatriate sportspeople in Mexico
Expatriate footballers in Mexico
Association football midfielders